Bally Sports South (BSSO) is an American regional sports network owned by Diamond Sports Group, and operates as an affiliate of Bally Sports Networks. The network carries regional coverage of professional and collegiate sports events from across the Southern United States, along with other sporting events and programming from Bally Sports.

Bally Sports South is available on cable providers throughout Alabama, Georgia, Kentucky, Mississippi, North Carolina, South Carolina and Tennessee. It is also available nationwide on satellite via DirecTV.

History

Bally Sports South was originally launched on August 29, 1990, as SportSouth, under the ownership of the Turner Broadcasting System, in conjunction with business partners Tele-Communications Inc. (TCI) and Scripps-Howard Broadcasting. At its launch, the channel held the regional cable television rights to the Atlanta Braves, Atlanta Hawks and Charlotte Hornets. Shortly after Turner completed its merger with Time Warner, SportSouth was purchased by News Corporation's Fox Cable Networks in the winter of 1996. The channel was integrated into the recently formed Fox Sports Net group of regional sports networks, and was officially rebranded as Fox Sports South in January 1997. The channel's name was amended to "Fox Sports Net South" in 2000, as part of a collective brand modification of the FSN networks under the "Fox Sports Net" banner).

In 2002, Fox Sports South began producing the Southern Sports Report from its Midtown Atlanta studios, as part of the collective FSN networks' expansion of "regional sports reports" to complement the National Sports Report, both formatted as daily news programs focusing on sports news and highlights. The Atlanta studios served as a production hub for the regional sports reports broadcast on other FSN networks, often utilizing the same anchors (with Terry Chick being the most prominent). The Southern Sports Report was discontinued in 2005; around the same time, FSN South began producing a similar program, Around The South, which focused on sports stories across the region. In 2004, the channel shortened its name to FSN South, through the networks' de-emphasis of the Fox Sports Net brand.

On February 23, 2006, News Corporation purchased the general entertainment cable channel Turner South from the Turner Broadcasting System for $375 million. After the deal was completed, the channel dropped all remaining entertainment programming and converted into a sports-exclusive channel as it became part of the Fox Sports Networks group, adopting the "SportSouth" name formerly used by Fox Sports South. FSN South, which effectively became a sister network to the new SportSouth (which was renamed Fox Sports Southeast in October 2015), reverted to the Fox Sports South moniker in 2008.

In 2008, SportSouth acquired the partial television rights to the Atlanta Braves, splitting the telecasts with Atlanta independent station WPCH-TV (channel 17), which ceased distributing the station's Braves telecasts nationally after its separation from its companion superstation feed TBS (which became a conventional cable network) in October 2007. After Turner turned over the operations of WPCH to the Meredith Corporation under a local marketing agreement in 2011, production of the Braves telecasts was transferred from Turner Sports to Fox Sports South, in a deal in which the channel would produce a package of 45 regular season games each year for WPCH.

On February 28, 2013, Fox Sports South and SportSouth reached a deal with the Braves to acquire the 45 additional Atlanta Braves games beginning with the 2013 season, ending the team's contract with WPCH-TV and marking the first time in 40 years that the team's game telecasts were not available on broadcast television in the Atlanta market. In July 2013, News Corporation spun off the Fox Sports Networks and most of its other U.S. entertainment properties into 21st Century Fox.

On December 14, 2017, as part of a merger between both companies, The Walt Disney Company announced plans to acquire all 22 regional Fox Sports networks from 21st Century Fox, including Fox Sports South and sister network Fox Sports Southeast. However, on June 27, 2018, the Justice Department ordered their divestment under antitrust grounds, citing Disney's ownership of ESPN. On May 3, 2019, Sinclair Broadcast Group and Entertainment Studios (through their joint venture, Diamond Holdings) bought Fox Sports Networks from The Walt Disney Company for $10.6 billion. The deal closed on August 22, 2019. On November 17, 2020, Sinclair announced an agreement with casino operator Bally's Corporation to serve as a new naming rights partner for the FSN channels. Sinclair announced the new Bally Sports branding for the channels on January 27, 2021.  On March 31, 2021, coinciding with the 2021 Major League Baseball season, Fox Sports South and sister network Fox Sports Southeast was rebranded as Bally Sports South and Bally Sports Southeast, resulting in 18 other Regional Sports Networks renamed Bally Sports in their respective regions. The first live sporting event on the regional network was the opening-day coverage of the Braves visiting the Phillies on April 1. The game was preceded by the "Braves Live" pregame show.

On March 14, 2023, Diamond Sports filed for Chapter 11 Bankruptcy.

Coverage area
Bally Sports South's coverage area includes Alabama, Georgia, Mississippi, North Carolina, South Carolina, Tennessee, and most of Kentucky. It is, by far, the largest coverage by area and total market reach of any Bally Sports affiliate. As such, the channel is often separated into several sub-regional feeds for the purposes of adhering to the various professional leagues' home territory rules.

For example, Memphis Grizzlies and Nashville Predators games are only seen in Tennessee, most of Kentucky, northern Mississippi and northern Alabama. Meanwhile, Charlotte Hornets and Carolina Hurricanes games are only seen in North and South Carolina. Neither team's games are seen elsewhere within Bally Sports South's coverage area, although Predators games are occasionally rebroadcast in North Carolina. The Atlanta Hawks also have restrictions preventing games from being carried in most of the Carolinas, parts of Mississippi, and all of Kentucky.

In some areas select games from neighboring Bally Sports Networks are carried on either Bally Sports South or an alternate channel. These include games from the St. Louis Cardinals (Bally Sports Midwest), Indiana Pacers (Bally Sports Indiana), Cincinnati Reds (Bally Sports Ohio), and New Orleans Pelicans (Bally Sports New Orleans).

In October 2008, Fox decided to split Fox Sports South into three separate channels to offer more localized sports coverage. It launched separate respective feeds for the Carolinas and most of Tennessee, Fox Sports Carolinas and Fox Sports Tennessee. Fox Sports considered these feeds as separate networks, which maintained their own sub-sites within the main Fox Sports Local website. These channels were collapsed back into the Bally Sports South name when it launched on March 31, 2021, with a common non-gametime schedule, but the separate feeds otherwise continue.

Teams by Media Market

Note: In Kentucky, most of North Carolina, and parts of Mississippi, Bally Sports Southeast is not available. In these areas all games are shown on Bally Sports South or an alternate channel.

Programming
Bally Sports South holds the exclusive regional cable television rights to the Atlanta Braves Major League Baseball franchise; the Atlanta Hawks, Charlotte Hornets and Memphis Grizzlies of the NBA; and the Carolina Hurricanes and Nashville Predators of the NHL. The channel also provides coverage of collegiate sports events from the Atlantic Coast Conference.

Announcers

Atlanta Braves
Brandon Gaudin – play-by-play announcer
Jeff Francoeur – analyst 
Treavor Scales - Braves LIVE host
Brian Jordan – Braves LIVE analyst
Nick Green – Braves LIVE analyst
Peter Moylan – Braves LIVE analyst
Paul Byrd – reporter
Kelly Crull – reporter / Braves LIVE fill-in pre-game and post-game

Atlanta Hawks
Bob Rathbun – play-by-play announcer
Dominique Wilkins – analyst
Andre Aldridge – sideline reporter / Hawks LIVE host
Mike Glenn – Hawks LIVE analyst
Rebecca Kaple – sideline reporter
Jerome Jurenovich - Hawks LIVE host

Carolina Hurricanes
Mike Maniscalco - play-by-play announcer
Tripp Tracy - analyst
Hanna Yates - Hurricanes LIVE host / in-game reporter
Shane Willis - Hurricanes LIVE analyst

Charlotte Hornets
Eric Collins – play-by-play announcer
Dell Curry – analyst
Ashley ShahAhmadi – sideline reporter / Hornets LIVE host
Gerald Henderson Hornets Live analyst

Memphis Grizzlies
Pete Pranica - play-by-play announcer
Brevin Knight - analyst
Rob Fischer - sideline reporter / Grizzlies LIVE host
Chris Vernon - Grizzlies LIVE analyst / contributor

Nashville Predators
Willy Daunic - play-by-play announcer
Chris Mason - analyst
Kara Hammer - rinkside reporter
Terry Crisp - Predators LIVE analyst 
Lyndsay Rowley - Predators LIVE host/reporter

Former Announcers
 Kevin Egan - Atlanta United play-by-play announcer
 Maurice Edu - Atlanta United analyst
 Jillian Sakovits - sideline reporter / Atlanta United LIVE host
 Chip Caray - Atlanta Braves play-by-play announcer

See also
 Comcast/Charter Sports Southeast
 Raycom Sports

References

External links

Fox Sports Networks
Turner Sports
Prime Sports
Television channels and stations established in 1990
Companies that filed for Chapter 11 bankruptcy in 2023
1990 establishments in Georgia (U.S. state)
Bally Sports
Former Time Warner subsidiaries